Medroxyprogesterone caproate (MPC) is a progestin and a progestogen ester which was synthesized in 1958 but was never marketed. It has been confused with hydroxyprogesterone caproate (OHPC) and medroxyprogesterone acetate (MPA) in a number of publications. In addition to MPA and OHPC, analogues of MPC include chlormadinone caproate, gestonorone caproate, megestrol caproate, and methenmadinone caproate.

See also
 List of progestogen esters § Esters of 17α-hydroxyprogesterone derivatives

References

Abandoned drugs
Caproate esters
Diketones
Pregnanes
Progestogen esters
Progestogens